Two ships of the Royal Australian Navy have been named Gunundaal.

, a fishing vessel acquired as an auxiliary minesweeper in 1917 and returned to owners in 1918
, a fishing vessel acquired as an auxiliary minesweeper in 1992 and stricken later that year

Royal Australian Navy ship names